Orlando Flacco or Fiacco ( 1560) was an Italian artist.

Life
Flacco, a native of Verona, was a painter who flourished about 1560. He a pupil of Francesco Torbido, known as Il Moro. His style much resembles that of Badile. Vasari praises his portraits, and Lanzi says that his forms resemble those of Caravaggio. He painted a Crucifixion and an Ecce Homo in the church of Santi Nazaro e Celso in Verona.

References

Sources

 

Year of birth unknown
Year of death unknown
16th-century Italian painters
Italian male painters
Italian Renaissance painters
Painters from Verona